The Metropolitan Community Church (MCC), also known as the Universal Fellowship of Metropolitan Community Churches (UFMCC), is an international LGBT-affirming mainline Protestant Christian denomination. There are 222 member congregations in 37 countries, and the fellowship has a specific outreach to lesbian, gay, bisexual, and transgender families and communities.

The fellowship has Official Observer status with the World Council of Churches. The MCC has been denied membership in the US National Council of Churches, but many local MCC congregations are members of local ecumenical partnerships around the world and MCC currently belongs to several statewide councils of churches in the United States. The MCC has also been considered to be non-denominational.

Beliefs and practices 

MCC bases its theology on the historic creeds of the Christian Church, such as Apostles' and Nicene creeds. Every church is required to celebrate the Eucharist at least once a week, and to practice open communion, meaning that recipients need not be a member of the MCC or any other church to receive the Eucharist. Beyond that MCC allows its member churches independence in doctrine, practice, and worship as worship styles vary from church to church. The MCC is considered to be Bible-based and many pastors take a fundamentalist approach to scripture.

MCC sees its mission being social as well as spiritual by standing up for the rights of minorities, particularly those of lesbian, gay, bisexual, and transgender (LGBT) people. MCC has been a leading force in the development of queer theology.

Many local churches are also involved with other national and international campaigns, including Trade Justice and Make Poverty History.

The MCC supports same-sex marriage, and has performed the first church-based weddings for same-sex couples in the United Kingdom. MCC's founder, Troy Perry, performed the first public same-sex marriage in the United States in Huntington Park, California, in 1969. In 1970, he filed the first lawsuit in the U.S. seeking legal recognition for same-sex marriages. Perry lost that lawsuit but launched the debate over marriage equality in the U.S. Today, MCC congregations around the world perform more than 6000 same-sex union/marriage ceremonies annually.

Brent Hawkes and the Metropolitan Community Church of Toronto were key players in the legal action that ultimately brought same-sex marriage to Canada.

A notable aspect of MCC's theology is its position on homosexuality and Christianity where it fully embraces and welcomes LGBT people. Indeed, the majority of members are lesbian, gay, bisexual, or transgender, with many clergy being openly LGBT. MCC fully affirms the ministry of both men and women, seeing them as equal, and the past election of Nancy Wilson as Moderator makes MCC one of a small number of communions with female senior leadership. The MCC also believes that abortion should be legal.

A new statement of faith was passed, almost unanimously, and was adopted at the 26th General Conference in Victoria, British Columbia. It is now considered one of the core documents of MCC, separate from its bylaws, as it is part of MCC formation and identity, but not part of its governance policies.

History 
The first congregation was founded in Huntington Park, California, by former Pentecostal pastor Troy Perry on October 6, 1968. This was a time when Christian attitudes toward homosexuality were almost universally unfavorable. The first congregation originally met in Perry's Huntington Park home. The church first gained publicity by ads taken out in The Advocate magazine. Perry declared the church was made up of born again believers.

In 1969 the congregation had outgrown Perry's living room and moved to rented space at the Huntington Park Women's Club. It was at this point in time membership in the church grew to about 200 people. Due to discrimination the church was forced to move, and had a hard time finding a permanent place. During this period during the spring and summer of 1969 the church moved first to the Embassy Auditorium, and then a United Methodist Church for two weeks. The church ended up renting out the Encore Theatre in Hollywood from 1969 through 1971.

Within months of the first worship service, Perry began receiving letters and visits from people who wanted to start Metropolitan Community Churches in other cities. MCC groups from eight U.S. cities were represented at the first General Conference in 1970: Los Angeles, San Francisco, San Diego, and Costa Mesa, California; Chicago, Illinois; Phoenix, Arizona; Kaneohe, Hawaii; and Dallas, Texas. An MCC group existed in Miami, Florida, but did not send a delegate.

The church had its final move to a building it purchased at 2201 South Union Avenue in Los Angeles in early 1971. The building was consecrated on March 7, 1971. MCC worshiped there until January 27, 1973, when the building was destroyed by what the Fire Department called a fire "of suspicious origin".

The MCC has grown since then to have a presence in 37 countries with 222 affiliated churches.  The largest presence is found in the United States, followed by Canada. The denomination continues to grow: In 2010, El Mundo reported that the first MCC congregation in Spain would be established in Madrid in October. If successfully established, the MCC would’ve been the first recognized church in Spain to officially solemnize same-sex marriages. An MCC congregation was not permanently established in Madrid in 2010, it is unclear why however. In 2018, the first religiously affiliated same-sex wedding recorded in Spain was performed by a vicar of the Lutheran Church of Sweden. The Lutheran Church of Sweden and the MCC are in partial communion with each other and the vicar is stationed in Spain on a long term 5 year mission. Despite these facts he cannot legally officiate any wedding wherein either party is a Spanish citizen and can only perform ceremonies in which at least one participant is a Swedish citizen. Later that year an MCC congregation finally opened in Madrid. As of 2020, the MCC website describes their “emerging” congregation in Madrid as thriving and expanding. When or if this congregation has performed any LGBTQ weddings is unclear however.

In 1972 Freda Smith became the first female minister in MCC, and was the first woman elected to the Board of Elders in 1973 at the fourth general conference in Atlanta, when the Board of Elders was expanded from four members to seven. Later MCC adopted gender inclusive language in its worship services.

Perry served as moderator of the fellowship until 2005, when Nancy Wilson was elected moderator by the General Conference; she was formally installed in a special service at the Washington National Cathedral in Washington, D.C. on October 29, 2005. She is only the second person, and the first woman, to serve as moderator.

In 2003, a scandal occurred involving the flagship of the church, as well as the largest gay church in the world, Cathedral of Hope, when former board member Terri Frey accused minister Michael S. Piazza of financial impropriety, an accusation that prompted the UFMCC to open an investigation. However, the investigation ended when the Cathedral's membership voted to disaffiliate from UFMCC with 88% support. In 2006, the Cathedral of Hope was received into membership in the United Church of Christ. The split cost UFMCC 9% of its membership, and 7% of its annual operating budget. Church members, including copastor Mona West, claimed that the vote was less about the investigation and more about the congregation's long-simmering frustration with the denomination, including the opinion that the denomination was focused too much on gay issues and hampered their desire to reach out to Dallas residents disaffected by conservative churches; as church member Michael Magnia explained: "The tie with MCC was more about gays and lesbians. You're going to have a difficult time getting even progressive heterosexuals to come to a church that is anchored to a gay and lesbian church."

In 2011 the Good Shepherd Parish of the MCC was inducted into the Chicago Gay and Lesbian Hall of Fame.

Governance and administration

Leadership 

MCC is led by a Council of Elders (COE) and a Governing Board. The Council of Elders consists of a Moderator and elders appointed by the Moderator, approved by the Governing Board, and affirmed by the General Conference. The COE has responsibility for leading the fellowship on matters of spirituality, mission development, and Christian witness. The Governing Board is made up of the Moderator, 4 Lay members and 4 Clergy members elected by General Conference, and is the legal corporate board of the denomination, handling responsibility for financial and fiduciary matters.

As of 2016, the Council of Elders includes  Rachelle Brown (Moderator), Nancy Wilson, Ines-Paul Baumann, Pat Bumgardner, Tony Freeman, Darlene Garner, Hector Gutierrez, Dwayne Johnson, Nancy Maxwell, Margarita Sánchez de Léon, Candace Shultis, and Mona West. The Governing Board includes Rachelle Brown (Interim Moderator and Chair ex officio), Joe Cobb, Victoria L. Burson, Miak Siew, and Dr. David L. Williams.

The primary responsibility of elders is to give pastoral leadership and care to enable the fellowship in its spiritual journey. The elders exercise spiritual and pastoral authority to build a shared vision for the UFMCC, prepare UFMCC for the future, and support UFMCC's strategic direction. The elders serve as official representatives of the fellowship in the areas of public and community relations; provide oversight of and support to congregations; consult with churches on issues related to church development; and fulfill other ecclesial and ceremonial duties.

In July 2019, a new Moderator and Governing Board were elected at the MCC General Conference in Orlando, Florida. The Moderator is Rev. Elder Celilia Eggleston. The Governing Board consists of Rev. Marie Alford-Harkey, Rev. Alberto Nájera, Rev. Elder Diane Fisher, and Rev. Paul Whiting, representing Clergy, and Chad Hobbs, Clare Coughlin, James Chavis, and Mark Godette, representing Laity.

General Conference 
Internationally, the government of the UFMCC is vested in the tri-annual General Conference, subject to the provisions of the fellowship Articles of Incorporation, its bylaws, or documents of legal organization.  The General Conference is authorized to receive the reports from the various boards, committees, commissions and councils of the fellowship.  Throughout its history the General Conference has met both in and outside of the continental United States, in places such as Sydney, Australia, and Toronto, Ontario and Calgary, Alberta in Canada.  The 2010 General Conference was held in Acapulco, Guerrero, with future conferences occurring every three years.  The 2013 General Conference was held in Chicago, Illinois, US. followed by Victoria, British Columbia, Canada in 2016 and Orlando, Florida, US in 2019.

List of regions
The worldwide church is administratively divided into seven regions, each of which are represented by an elder on the Council of Elders. Since the 2000s, many are further divided into sub-regional networks. 
 Region 1: Region 1 Australia, Bangladesh, Brunei, Cambodia, Western Canada (British Columbia, Yukon), China, Micronesia, Fiji, Hong Kong, India, Indonesia, Japan, Laos, Malaysia, Mongolia, Myanmar, Nepal, New Zealand, North Korea, Pakistan, Papua New Guinea, Philippines, Eastern Russia, South Korea, Sri Lanka, Sumatra, Taiwan, Thailand, Vanuatu, Vietnam and the United States of America (Alaska, California (Northern), Hawaii, Idaho, Montana, North Dakota, Oregon, South Dakota, Utah, Washington, and Wyoming).
 Australasia Network
 Pacific Northwest Network
 Valley & Bay Area Network
 Asia & Pacific Islands Network
 Region 2 - Canada (Manitoba and Nunavut), and the United States of America (Alabama, Arkansas, Georgia, Illinois, Iowa, Kansas, Louisiana, Minnesota, Mississippi, Missouri, Tennessee, Texas (Eastern), and Wisconsin).
 Georgia, Tennessee, Alabama Network
 Heartland Network
 North Central US Network
 South Gulf Coast Network

 Region 3 - Antigua & Barbuda, Bahamas, Barbados, Bermuda, Cuba, Dominican Republic, Grenada, Guadeloupe, Haiti, Jamaica, Martinique, Puerto Rico, St. Kitts & Nevis, St. Lucia, St. Vincent, Trinidad, Tobago, Turks & Caicos Islands, Virgin Islands and the United States of America (Delaware, Maryland, New Jersey, New York, North Carolina, Pennsylvania, South Carolina, Virginia, the District of Columbia (Washington, DC).
 Northeast United States Network
 DC, Delaware, Maryland & Virginia Network
 Carolinas Network

 Region 4 - Afghanistan, Algeria, Angola, Austria, Azerbaijan, Bahrain, Belgium, Benin, Botswana, Burundi, Cameroon, Central African Republic, Chad, Congo, Denmark, Egypt, England, Eswatini,  Ethiopia, Finland, France, Gabon, Germany, Ghana, Greece, Greenland, Holland, Iceland, Iran, Iraq, Ireland, Israel, Italy, Jordan, Kenya, Kuwait, Lebanon, Liberia, Libya, Morocco, Mozambique, Namibia, Niger, Nigeria, Norway, Oman, Portugal, Rwanda, Saudi Arabia, Scotland, Senegal, Sierra Leone, Somalia, South Africa, Spain, Sudan, Sweden, Syria, Tanzania, Togo, Tunisia, Uganda, United Arab Emirates, Wales, Yemen, Zambia, and Zimbabwe.
 Western Europe/United Kingdom Network
 African Network
 Region 5 - Albania, Armenia, Belarus, Bosnia-Herzegovina, Bulgaria, Croatia, Eastern Canada (Baffin Island, New Brunswick, Newfoundland, Nova Scotia, Ontario, Prince Edward Island, Quebec), Estonia, Georgia, Hungary, Kazakhstan, Kosovo, Kyrgyzstan, Latvia, Lithuania, Macedonia, Moldova, Montenegro, Poland, Romania, Russia, Serbia, Slovakia, Slovenia, The Czech Republic, Tajikistan, Turkey, Turkmenistan, Ukraine, United States of America (Connecticut, Indiana, Kentucky, Maine, Massachusetts, Michigan, New Hampshire, Ohio, Rhode Island, Vermont, West Virginia), Uzbekistan, Vojvodina.
 Central US East Network
 Canadian, Michigan & Windsor Network
 Region 6 - Antarctica, Argentina, Belize, Bolivia, Brazil, Chile, Colombia, Costa Rica, Ecuador, El Salvador, French Guiana, Guatemala, Guyana, Honduras, Mexico, Nicaragua, Panama, Paraguay, Peru, Suriname, Uruguay, Venezuela and the United States of America (Arizona, California (Southern), Nevada, New Mexico, and Texas (Southern).
 Southern California/Nevada Network
 Arizona, New Mexico & El Paso Network
 Southern Texas Network
 Ibero-America & Caribbean Network
 Region 7 - Western Canada (Alberta, Saskatchewan, Northwest Territories), and the United States of America (Colorado, Florida, Nebraska, Oklahoma, and Texas (Northern).
 North Florida Network
 Central Florida Network
 North Texas and Oklahoma Network
 South Florida Network

Local congregations 

Each affiliated member church of MCC is a self-governing, legally autonomous body, is vested in its congregational meeting which exerts the right to control all of its affairs, subject to the provisions of the UFMCC Articles of Incorporation, bylaws, or documents of legal organization, and the General Conference. An ordained pastor provides spiritual leadership and administrative leadership as the moderator of a local church administrative body. In the United States and Canada the local church administrative body is usually called "board of directors". Each local congregation is required to send a tithe or assessment of income to UFMCC, currently set to reduce from 15% of income to 10% by 1% every two years stating in 2005.  Each local church elects its own pastor from the roster of MCC credentialed clergy.

Each local congregation is free to determine matters of worship, practice, theology and ministry providing they meet certain basic requirements involving open access to communion and subscription to the traditional Christian creeds. Styles of worship include liturgical, charismatic, evangelical, traditional and modern — diversity is an important part of MCC.

Philippines controversy
The Metropolitan Community Church of Baguio solemnized the union of one gay couple and seven lesbian couples at a bar called Ayuyang Bar. This is the first MCC Baguio ceremony that has agitated the Philippines' mainstream evangelical churches.

MCC Baguio is a local chapter of the MCC in Quezon City, which ministers to homosexuals. Pastor Myke Sotero of MCC Baguio stated that the service was a "Christian celebration of love and relationship". The rites are not considered marriage since the Philippine government does not recognize gay marriage. Couples who participated in the union were also criticized by local church leaders. Bishop Donald Soriano of the Bethesda Ministries Calvary Pentecostal Church, said that they will denounce same-sex unions.

Notable clergy 
This list includes notable present and former clergy associated with MCC.

 James Ferry
 Darlene Garner
 Chris Glaser
 Bob Goss
 Brent Hawkes
 Troy Perry (founder)
 Jeff Rock
 Robert Sirico (former MCC minister) 
 Rembert S. Truluck
 Jean White
 Mel White
 Nancy Wilson (moderator as of 2005)
 Bob Wolfe

See also 

 :Category:Metropolitan Community Churches
 LGBT-welcoming church programs
 Lesbian and Gay Christian Movement
 New Pacific Academy
 Queer theology
 UpStairs Lounge arson attack

References

External links 

 

 
LGBT churches
Liberal Christianity denominations
International LGBT organizations
Organizations established in 1968
1968 establishments in California
1968 in LGBT history
LGBT history in California
LGBT history in the United States